Jean-François Istasse (27 November 1950 – 25 July 2021) was a Belgian politician who served as a Deputy.

He studied at the Royal Athénée of Verviers (Humanities), at the Royal Athens of Etterbeek (5th and 6th primary) and Stanleyville (ex-Belgian Congo for goalkeepers and primary). Graduated (law degree) from the University of Liège in 1973, and master in public management from the Solvay Brussels School of Economics and Management in 1991.

References

1950 births
2021 deaths
Belgian politicians
Members of the Parliament of the French Community
Members of the Parliament of Wallonia
Members of the Senate (Belgium)
Socialist Party (Belgium) politicians
University of Liège alumni
Université libre de Bruxelles alumni
People from Uccle